Gunnar Bakke (born 24 October 1959) is a Norwegian politician for the Progress Party, and the mayor of Bergen between 2007-2011.

Personal life
Bakke was born in the city of Bergen. He was CEO of the bakery chain Baker Brun until mid-2007, and former board leader of Gaia Trafikk which was the largest public transportation provider in Bergen and Os until it merged with HSD in 2006, forming Tide. In 2010 he became Patron of the Scottish-based, global street-paper network International Network of Street Papers, being noticed for his support of the local Bergen-based street-paper Megafon.

He is married, has one child, and is educated as a baker.

Political career
Bakke has been active in local politics since 1989, and has held numerous offices at municipal and county level for the Progress Party, including member of the Bergen city council from 1995 to 2007, and Hordaland county council since 2003. In 2007 he became mayor of Bergen, the first for the Progress Party in the city.

References

1959 births
Living people
Norwegian businesspeople
Norwegian Christians
Mayors of Bergen
Progress Party (Norway) politicians